Khuda Gawah is a Pakistani action romance television series that was aired on 2007 on ATV. Khuda Gawah is a type of film changed into drama it is directed by Sohail Iftikhar Khan written by Asif Ali Pota Music by Wajis Ali Nashad and its cast including Arbaaz Khan, Saba Qamar and Nayyar Ijaz. The series is the adaptation of the 1992  Indian film Khuda Gawah which starred Sridevi, Amitabh Bachchan and Danny Denzongpa.

Cast
 Arbaz Khan
 Saba Qamar as Sonia
 Nayyar Ijaz
 Rustam
 Aurangzeb Eshai
 Shamil Khan
 Bilal Khan
 Mohsin Gillani
 Anwar Khan
 Ashraf Rahi
 Humayun Gull
 Rasheed Ali
 Khawar Butt
 Sharjeel
 Anjum
 Saleem Hassan
 Wali Shah
 Shahzeeb
Deeba
Laila Zubari
 Rabia Tabasum
 Jana Malik
 Minal
 Kiran Shah
 Straberro
 Nadi Begum
Badar Khallil

References

Pakistani drama television series